Roberto Sabatino Lopez (October 8, 1910 –  July 6, 1986) was an Italian-born American historian of medieval European economic history. He taught for many years at Yale University as a Sterling Professor of History.

Early life and education
Roberto Sabatino Lopez was born in Genoa, Italy. His family were Sephardi Jews. He received a doctorate from the University of Milan in 1932 and taught medieval history at various universities, serving at one point as Chair of History at the University of Genoa. Lopez fled Benito Mussolini's regime for England in 1939, where he came under the influence of Cecil Roth. Robert L. Reynolds, a friend of Lopez, informed him that an American Ph.D. was necessary to find tenure at an American university, and through the influence of Reynolds, Lopez enrolled in the graduate history program at the University of Wisconsin-Madison. Here he gained a Ph.D. in 1942.

Early work in the United States
From 1942 to 1944 Lopez worked for Voice of America and in the Italian section of the Office of War Information in New York City. There he met his future wife, Claude-Anne Kirschen, a wartime refugee from Belgium who had come to New York with her family in 1940. He afterward maintained that his successful courtship of her was his supreme wartime accomplishment.

Marriage and family
Lopez married Claude-Anne Kirschen, a Jewish refugee from Belgium, in 1946. They had two sons, Michael and Lawrence, after moving to New Haven, Connecticut. The children were raised in the Jewish faith.

Resumption of academic career
In 1946, Lopez was hired as an assistant professor at Yale University. He rose through the academic ranks to full professor. He was honored by selection as a Sterling Professor of History, a recognition of his academic contributions. Lopez was one of the first Jews appointed at Yale University.

At Yale, in 1962 Lopez founded the interdisciplinary graduate program in Medieval Studies, and served as its chairman for many years. Originally a master's program, it awarded doctorates by 1965. When founded, it was the third such medieval studies program in the United States.

Lopez trained a number of distinguished medieval scholars, among them David Herlihy, Edward M. Peters, and Patrick J. Geary. Lopez retired from the Yale faculty in 1981 after 35 years at the university.

Lopez's main contributions to the field were in the history of trade and commerce in the medieval Mediterranean. He was particularly interested in showing the dynamism and creativity of medieval towns and economic networks. Other scholars had frequently compared them unfavorably to those of the Renaissance and early modern period.

In his best-known book, The Commercial Revolution of the Middle Ages (1971, with numerous reprints), Lopez argued that the key contribution of the medieval period to European history was the creation of a commercial economy. He said it was first based in the Italo-Byzantine eastern Mediterranean, but eventually extended to the Italian city-states and through the rest of Europe. Lopez noted that it was the Renaissance period that was characterized by economic decline. Lopez's scholarship was underpinned by his expert knowledge of medieval agriculture, industry and especially coinage.

At the end of his career, Lopez maintained close ties to Israeli academia. He was affiliated with the Israel Institute for Advanced Studies and the Hebrew University of Jerusalem, and his advice was sought on the tenure cases of Israeli medievalists. Lopez was a notable adviser of Walter Goffart.

Lopez died from cancer in 1986. His library and papers were acquired by Arizona State University.

Books
Medieval Trade in the Mediterranean World (edited with Irving W. Raymond) (1955; 2nd ed. 1969)
The Tenth Century: How Dark the Dark Ages? (1959)
The Birth of Europe (1966)
The Three Ages of the Italian Renaissance (1970)
The Commercial Revolution of the Middle Ages (1971)
Byzantium and the World around It: Economic and Institutional Relations (1978)
The Shape of Medieval Monetary History (1986)

Notes

Sources

Further reading
Harry A. Miskimin, David Herlihy and A.L. Udovitch (eds). The Medieval City: Studies in Honor of Robert S. Lopez. Yale University Press, 1977.
Archibald R. Lewis, Jaroslav Pelikan and David Herlihy. "Robert Sabatino Lopez". Speculum 63:3 (1988): 763–65.

External links
Robert S. Lopez (1979). "The Birth of Medieval Banking"
Survey of Lopez's career and scholarship (at Arizona State)
Robert Sabatino Lopez Papers (MS 1459). Manuscripts and Archives, Yale University Library.

1910 births
1986 deaths
20th-century Italian historians
20th-century American historians
American male non-fiction writers
20th-century Sephardi Jews
Economic historians
Italian emigrants to the United States
20th-century Italian Jews
Jewish emigrants from Nazi Germany to the United States
Jewish American historians
Writers from Genoa
University of Milan alumni
University of Wisconsin–Madison College of Letters and Science alumni
Yale University faculty
Yale Sterling Professors
Fellows of the Medieval Academy of America
People of the United States Office of War Information
Italian Sephardi Jews
20th-century American male writers